Hebbal  is a village in the state of Karnataka, India. It is located in the Krishnarajanagara taluk of Mysore district.

See also
 Mysore
 Districts of Karnataka

References

Villages in Mysore district